Théodore Nézel (25 February 1799 – 23 May 1854) was a 19th-century French playwright and librettist.

An employee at the ministry of public instruction, he was appointed managing director of the Théâtre du Panthéon in 1838. His plays, often signed "Théodore" or "Théodore N." were presented on the most important Parisian stages of the 19th century including the Théâtre de l'Ambigu, the Théâtre des Nouveautés, the Théâtre du Palais-Royal, and the Théâtre des Variétés.

Works 

 La Famille irlandaise, melodrama in 3 acts, 1821
 L'Aubergiste malgré lui, comédie proverbe, with Nicolas Brazier, 1823
 La Chambre de Clairette, ou les Visites par la fenêtre, vaudeville in 1 act, with Armand Joseph Overnay, 1825
 Les Deux réputations, comédie-vaudeville in 1 act, with Overnay, 1825
 Six mois de constance, comedy in 1 act, mingled with couplets, with Overnay and Constant Berrier, 1825
 Le Banqueroutier, melodrama in 3 acts, with Overnay, 1826
 La Couturière, drama in 3 acts, with Overnay, 1826
 La dame voilée, comedy in 3 acts, with Constant Berrier and Overnay, 1826
 La Nuit des noces, drama in 3 acts, with Overnay, 1826
 Cartouche, melodrama in 3 acts, with Overnay, 1827
 Poulailler, melodrama in 9 acts, with Antier, 1827
 Bisson, melodrama in 2 acts and in 5 parts, extravaganza, with Benjamin Antier, 1828
 Le Chasseur noir, melodrama in 3 acts extravaganza, with Antier, Overnay and Frédérick Lemaître, 1828
 La Demoiselle et la paysanne, comedy in 1 act and in prose, 1828
 La Nourrice sur lieu, scènes de famille, mingled with couplets, with Armand-François Jouslin de La Salle, Louis Gabriel Montigny and Jean-Gilbert Ymbert, 1828
 Les lanciers et les marchandes de modes, one-act play, mingled with couplets, with Antier, Overnay and E. F. Varez, 1828
 Roc l'exterminateur, melodrama comic in 3 parts, with Adrien Payn, 1828
 Isaure, drama in 3 acts, mingled with songs, with Antier and Francis Cornu, 1829
 La partie d'ânes, folie in 1 act, with Saint-Amand and Henry Villemot, 1829
 Rochester, drama in 3 acts and in 6 parts, with Antier, 1829
 John Bull, ou le Chaudronnier anglais, two-act play, with Overney and E. F. Varez, 1830
 Napoléon en paradis, vaudeville in 1 act, with Antoine Simonnin and Antier, 1830
 La prise de la Bastille ; Passage du Mont Saint-Bernard, gloire populaire, with Villemot and Laloue, 1830
 Youli, ou les Souliotes, melodrama in 2 acts and 5 tableaux, with Villemot and Henri Franconi, 1830
 Les Massacres, fièvre cérébrale in 3 acts and in vers casrés ["sic"], prececed by Le Diable au spectacle, prologue, with Antier, 1831
 Les Six degrés du crime, melodrama in 3 acts, with Antier, 1831
 L'Arlequin et le Pape, historical vaudeville in 1 act, with Simonnin, 1831
 Catherine II, ou l'Impératrice et le Cosaque, play in 2 acts, extravaganza, mingled with couplets, with Simonnin, 1831
 Joachim Murat, historical drama in 4 acts and 9 tableaux, with Antier and Alexis Decomberousse, 1831
 Les Lions de Mysore, play in 3 acts and 7 tableaux, 1831
 La Papesse Jeanne, vaudeville-anecdote in 1 act, with Simonnin, 1831
 Le Pâtissier usurpateur, historical play in 5 little acts, with Simonnin and Antier, 1831
 Le Tir et le restaurant, comédie-vaudeville in 1 act, with Overnay and Payn, 1831
 L’Âne mort et la femme guillotinée, folie-vaudeville in 3 acts, with Simonnin, 1832
 Le Cuisinier politique, vaudeville non politique, in 1 act, with Simonnin, 1832
 Le Curé et les chouans, comedy in 1 act and in prose, with Simonnin, 1832
 La Jeune comtesse, comédie-vaudeville in 1 act, with Simonnin, 1832
 Le Suicide d'une jeune fille, drama in 3 acts, imitated from the German language, with Antier and Hyacinthe de Flers, 1832
 Zerline, ou le Peintre et la courtisane, vaudeville in 1 act, with Simonnin, 1832
 La Peau de chagrin, ou le Roman en action, romantic extravaganza, comédie-vaudeville in 3 acts, with Simonnin, 1831
 Dieu et diable, ou la Conversion de Mme Dubarry, historical vaudeville in 1 act, with Simonnin, 1833
 Judith et Holopherne, épisode de la 1re guerre d'Espagne, vaudeville in 2 acts, with Emmanuel Théaulon, 1834
 L'art de quitter sa maîtresse, ou Les premiers présents de l'amour, tableau-vaudeville in 1 act, with Simonnin, 1834
 1834 et 1835, ou le Déménagement de l'année, revue épisodique in 1 act, with Théaulon and Frédéric de Courcy, 1834
 L'Idiote, comédie-vaudeville in 1 act, with Théaulon, 1834
 Trois ans après, ou la Sommation respectueuse, drama in 4 acts, with Auguste-Louis-Désiré Boulé, 1834
 La prova d'un opera seria ou Les italiens à Carpentras, opéra-bouffe in 1 act, with Théaulon, 1835
 Les bédouins à la barrière, folie-vaudeville in 1 act, with Eugène Ronteix, 1836
 Le Sabotier ambitieux, comical drama in 4 acts and 3 tableaux, mingled with couplets, with Théophile Marion Dumersan, 1836
 L'Enfant de Paris, ou Misère et liberté, vaudeville in 1 act, with Overnay, 1838
 Paul Jones, drama in 5 acts, in prose, with Alexandre Dumas père, 1838
 Brisquet, ou L'héritage de mon oncle, comédie-vaudeville in 2 acts, with Ferdinand Laloue, 1843
 Vautrin et Frise-Poulet, folie-vaudeville in 1 act, with Mélesville, 1848
 Titine à la cour, vaudeville, with Félix Dutertre de Véteuil, 1849
 Louise de Vaulcroix, drama in 5 acts, with prologue and epilogue, with Paul de Guerville, 1850
 Les Filles de l'air, folie-vaudeville in 1 act, with the Cogniard brothers, 1851
 Les Violettes de Lucette, vaudeville in 2 acts, with Dutertre, 1852
 Mil huit cent trente quatre et mil huit cent trente cinq, revue, with Théaulon, undated

Bibliography 
 Joseph Marie Quérard, La France littéraire, ou Dictionnaire bibliographique des savants..., vol.6, 1834, p. 407-408 
 Joseph Marie Quérard, Gustave Brunet, Pierre Jannet, Les supercheries littéraires dévoilées, 1869, p. 1070
 Bulletin de la Société de l'Histoire du Théâtre, 1908, p. 59
 

19th-century French dramatists and playwrights
French theatre managers and producers
French librettists
1799 births
Writers from Paris
1854 deaths